Polyura andrewsi is a butterfly in the family Nymphalidae. It was described by Arthur Gardiner Butler in 1900. It is endemic to Christmas Island in the Indian Ocean.

References

External links
Polyura Billberg, 1820 at Markku Savela's Lepidoptera and Some Other Life Forms

Polyura
Butterflies described in 1900